Zell an der Pram is a town and a municipality in the district of Schärding in the Austrian state of Upper Austria.

Geography
Zell lies in the Innviertel. About 14 percent of the municipality is forest, and 76 percent is farmland.

The municipality includes the following populated places (Ortschaften)

References

Cities and towns in Schärding District